Salustiano Paco Varela (29 January 1914 - 30 January 1987) was an Argentine tango bandoneónist, bandleader and composer.

Varela was born and raised in Avellaneda in the Buenos Aires Province of Argentina, where he trained as an accountant. He played in several bands from the age of 16, including those of Alberto Gambino and Juan d'Arienzo. He went on to form his own tango orchestra, which performed on Argentine radio and television in the 1950s and 1960s. He worked with several singers, including Rodolfo Lesica, whom he met in a taxi, and Argentino Ledesma.

External links
Héctor Varela at todotango.com
Héctor Varela at tango.info
 

1914 births
1987 deaths
People from Avellaneda
Argentine people of Galician descent
Argentine tango musicians
Burials at La Chacarita Cemetery
20th-century composers